Muhammad Hami Syahin bin Said (born 16 December 1998) is a Singaporean professional footballer who plays as a midfielder for Singapore Premier League club Lion City Sailors and the Singapore national team.

Club career

Young Lions

Hami began his club career with S.League club Young Lions in 2015. However, he made zero appearance for the club. In 2016, Hami earned his first cap and played almost all matches throughout the 2016 S.League season. He scored his first goal against Warriors.

Home United
In 2019, Hami joined Home United from Young Lions.

During Home United's 2019 AFC Cup Group H opening match, Hami scored a long range volley to equalise against Indonesian side PSM Makassar to secure a point with a 1-1 draw.

Hami scored the decisive penalty for Home United in the 2019 Singapore Community Shield. Due to a combination of injuries to Izzdin Shafiq as well as the constant coaching changes, Hami was mainly deployed in the defensive midfield position.

International career
Hami was initially selected in the 40 players provisional squad by head coach V. Sundramoorthy for the 2016 AFF Championship. However, he was not included in the final 23 man squad to take part in the competition.

Hami was called up in June 2017 for a closed door friendly against Myanmar on 6 June 2017, 2019 AFC Asian Cup qualification match against Chinese Taipei on 10 June 2017 and a friendly against Argentina on 13 June 2017.

Hami was also called up for 2017 Southeast Asian Games.

Hami made his official debut on 5 September 2019, against Yemen in an eventual 2-2 draw.

In 2022, Hami was included in the team for the 2022 FAS Tri-Nations Series and 2022 AFF Championship.

Others

Singapore Selection Squad
He was selected as part of the Singapore Selection squad for The Sultan of Selangor's Cup to be held on 6 May 2017.

Career statistics

Club
. Caps and goals may not be correct.

 Young Lions are ineligible for qualification to AFC competitions in their respective leagues.

Honours

International
Singapore U22
 Merlion Cup: 2019

References

Living people
1998 births
Young Lions FC players
Singaporean footballers
Singapore international footballers
Association football forwards
Competitors at the 2017 Southeast Asian Games
Competitors at the 2019 Southeast Asian Games
Home United FC players
Lion City Sailors FC players
Southeast Asian Games competitors for Singapore